Rock Island, Texas may refer to the following places:

Rock Island, Colorado County, Texas
Rock Island, Polk County, Texas
Rock Island, Washington County, Texas